Javadabad (also Romanized as Javādābād) is a village in Irandegan Rural District, Irandegan District, Khash County, Sistan and Baluchestan Province, Iran. At the 2006 census, its population was 38, in 8 families.

References 

Populated places in Khash County